Tyrick Bodak (born 15 February 2002) is a Curaçaoan professional footballer who plays as a goalkeeper for Eerste Divisie team Jong PSV and the Curaçao national team.

Club career
Bodak is a former youth academy player of De Graafschap. He joined PSV in June 2019. On 11 August 2020, he signed his first professional contract with the club.

International career
Bodak is a former Curaçaoan youth international. In July 2021, he was named in Curaçao's 22-man squad for 2021 CONCACAF Gold Cup. He made his senior team debut on 9 October 2021 in a 2–1 defeat against New Zealand.

Career statistics

Club

International

References

External links
 

2002 births
Living people
Association football goalkeepers
Curaçao footballers
Curaçao international footballers
Jong PSV players